When We Were Repressed is a 1992 Italian comedy film written and directed  by Pino Quartullo, at his directorial debut.

Plot

Cast

 Pino Quartullo as Massimiliano 
 Alessandro Gassman as Federico 
 Francesca D'Aloja as Isabella 
 Lucrezia Lante della Rovere as Petra 
 Vittorio Gassman as The Sexologist

References

External links

Italian comedy films
1992 comedy films
Films directed by Pino Quartullo
1992 directorial debut films
1992  films
1990s Italian-language films
1990s Italian films